Shelter Island Heights Historic District is a national historic district located at Shelter Island Heights in Suffolk County, New York. There are 141 contributing buildings and one contributing structure.

It was added to the National Register of Historic Places in 1993.

References

External links
The Heights (Shelter Island.org)

Historic districts on the National Register of Historic Places in New York (state)
Historic districts in Suffolk County, New York
National Register of Historic Places in Suffolk County, New York